Karelinia is a genus of flowering plants in the daisy family.

The genus is named in honor of Grigory Karelin (1801-1872), Russian explorer.

Species
There is only one known species, Karelinia caspia, native to European Russia, Altai, Kazakhstan, Uzbekistan, Kyrgyzstan, Tajikistan, Turkmenistan, Turkey, Afghanistan, Iran, China (Xinjiang, Inner Mongolia, Qinghai, Gansu), and Mongolia.

References

Monotypic Asteraceae genera
Inuleae